James Cameron Allen (January 29, 1822 – January 30, 1912) was a U.S. Representative from Illinois.

Born in Shelby County, Kentucky to Benjamin and Margaret (née Youel) Allen, the seventh of ten children. His family moved to Parke County, Indiana in 1830.

Allen read law in the office of Howard & Wright in Rockville, Indiana, and in August, 1843, he was admitted to the bar and began to practice in Sullivan, Indiana. He served as prosecuting attorney for the seventh judicial district of Indiana 1846-1848 before moving to Palestine, Illinois, where he continued to practice law. He served as a member of the Illinois House of Representatives from the 10th district from 1851 to 1853.

Allen was elected as a Democrat to the Thirty-third Congress (March 4, 1853 – March 3, 1855). When he presented his credentials as a Member-elect to the Thirty-fourth Congress and served from March 4, 1855, to July 18, 1856, the House decided he was not entitled to the seat due to a challenge by Colonel William B. Archer, who claimed there were irregularities in the election.

Allen was subsequently elected to fill the vacancy thus caused and was allowed to serve from November 4, 1856, to March 3, 1857.
He was not a candidate for renomination in 1856. Following his term in office, he served as the Clerk of the House of Representatives in the Thirty-fifth Congress from 1857 to 1859. He was an unsuccessful candidate for Illinois Governor in 1860, losing to Richard Yates.

In 1861 Governor Yates offered Allen the command of the 21st Illinois Infantry Regiment. Allen declined, claiming no military experiences and recommended that the command be offered to Ulysses S. Grant.

Allen was elected circuit court judge in April 1861 and served until he resigned in 1863 to serve a second term in Congress during the Thirty-eighth Congress (March 4, 1863 – March 3, 1865). He was an unsuccessful candidate for reelection in 1864, losing to Shelbyville, Illinois state legislator Samuel W. Moulton.  He returned to Illinois to practice law.

He was reelected circuit court judge in 1873 and upon the establishment of the appellate court was appointed its judge, occupying both positions and serving from 1873 to 1879.

Private life

Allen married Ellen Kitchell on January 22, 1845, to Ellen Kitchell, the daughter of Joseph Kitchell. They had three children. Ellen Allen died in May, 1852. In June, 1857, Allen married Julia Kitchell, the daughter of Harvey Kitchell. He had seven more children with his second wife.

He moved to Olney, Illinois, in 1876 and practiced law until he retired in 1907.

He died in Olney on January 30, 1912, the day after his 90th birthday, and is buried in Olney Cemetery.

References

1822 births
1912 deaths
Clerks of the United States House of Representatives
Democratic Party members of the United States House of Representatives from Illinois
Illinois state court judges
Judges of the Illinois Appellate Court
Democratic Party members of the Illinois House of Representatives
People from Palestine, Illinois
People from Shelby County, Kentucky
People from Sullivan, Indiana
19th-century American politicians
People from Olney, Illinois
19th-century American judges
Members of the United States House of Representatives removed by contest